Alexander Gudov (16 September 1932 — 7 November 2004) —  Honoured Test Pilot of the USSR (1984), captain (1978).

Biography 
Gudov was born in Svinets village of Kursk Oblast and was raised in an orphanage.

During World War II he witnessed an air battle, which inspired him to become a pilot – while still a child, he made a tattoo on his wrist in the form of an airplane.

Having graduated from the Sasovo Flight School of the Civil Air Fleet, he moves to Kiev and joins the Kiev United Air Squadron (Aeroflot).

1957 - 1986 - a test pilot of the Kiev aircraft factory.

Tested head planes: An-24 (31.01.1962, 2-nd pilot), An-26 (22.06.1969), and An-30 (12.03.1973, 2-nd pilot).

Was testing serial planes: An-2 (1957-1963), An-24 (1962-1979), An-26 (1969-1986), An-30 (1973-1978), An-32 (1983-1986) and their modifications.

Died on November 7, 2004, in Kyiv. Was buried in Kyiv at Berkovets Cemetery.

Awards 
 Honoured Test Pilot of the USSR

Sources 
 Александр Константинович Гудов // А.А. Симонов - Заслуженные испытатели СССР, М.: Авиамир, 2009 - С. 66-67

1932 births
2004 deaths
People from Manturovsky District, Kursk Oblast